Munisteri is a surname. Notable people with the surname include:

Mary Ryan Munisteri, American television soap opera writer
Steve Munisteri (born 1957), American politician